Branka Katić (born 20 January 1970) is a Serbian actress known for appearing in the films Black Cat, White Cat and Public Enemies, and the TV series Big Love.

Career

Katić debuted in the film Nije lako sa muškarcima when she was 14 years old. She was a student of the Academy of Dramatic Art, and received instruction from actor Rade Šerbedžija. She appeared in theatre in Subotica, Novi Sad and Belgrade. Her film appearances include Black Cat, White Cat, In July and Public Enemies. Her television work includes playing Tatiana Taylor, the second wife of Barry Taylor, in Auf Wiedersehen, Pet; Ana, Bill Henrickson's fourth wife for a brief period on the HBO series Big Love; Charlotte Kaletta in the TV miniseries Anne Frank: The Whole Story; Nika Marx, the producer's wife in the episode "The Prince's Bride" of Entourage; and as a prostitute in an episode of The Vice.

Personal life

Katić is married to British film and television director Julian Farino. They have two sons: Louis and Joe.

Filmography

External links
 
 Branka Katić, Džoni Dep i Džon Dilindžer, MTS Mondo, 28 February 2008
 Branka Katic, at the Fanpix
 Branka katic, at the Filmbug
 Interview with Branka Katic, at the Standard
 Interview with Branka katic about Johnny Depp, at the Zvezde

1970 births
Living people
Actresses from Belgrade
20th-century Serbian actresses
21st-century Serbian actresses
Serbian film actresses
Serbian television actresses
Serbian child actresses
Yugoslav child actresses